The Pennsylvania Collegiate Athletic Association (PCAA) was an athletic conference established in 1972 in the Commonwealth of Pennsylvania as a partnership between the Eastern Pennsylvania Athletic Association (EPCC) and Western Pennsylvania Athletic Association (WPCC). The conference was established for two-year institutions.  The Association ceased to exist in June of 2012. Both the EPCC and the WPCC were separate entities functioning as athletic conferences, both with long-standing success and local notoriety. Both the EPCC and the WPCC governed themselves and functioned separately from one another however the EPCC champion and the WPCC champion face each other in a special post-season match to crown a PCAA champion each season within each sport. The PCAA offered competition in a total of six men's sports, six women's sports, and three co-ed team sports.

The PCAA & The NJCAA
Some PCAA members had a partnership with the National Junior College Athletic Association (NJCAA) which serves as a level of accountability for the EPCC and the WPCC. The PCAA has adopted many of its policies and regulations from the NJCAA. Although the PCAA is not an officially chartered conference of the NJCAA, several of the schools in both the EPCC and WPCC are member schools of the NJCAA and play in NJCAA sanctioned competition, especially in sports not offered by the PCAA. Many NJCAA schools compete in local/regional post-season tournaments within their conference (such as the EPCC and WPCC championship tournaments) and also compete in national post-season competition, just like most NCAA and NAIA schools do.

PCAA School Membership
The EPCC and WPCC were composed of the junior colleges, community colleges, and technical schools in the Commonwealth of Pennsylvania that have varsity athletic programs. Past Commissioners included Charles "Chuck" Bell CCAC North (three terms) Charles "Chuck" Dunaway Butler CC (two terms), Mike Stanzione Penn College, Bill Bearse Northampton CC amongst many others. RoseAnn Palsi from Northampton CC served as its secretary for 29 years, from 1983-2012.

EPCC Members
Bucks County Community College
Central Penn College
Community College of Philadelphia
Delaware County Community College
Harcum College
Harrisburg Area Community College
Johnson College
Lackawanna College
Lehigh Carbon Community College
Luzerne County Community College
Manor College
Montgomery County Community College
Northampton Community College
Reading Area Community College
Thaddeus Stevens College of Technology

WPCC Members
Community College of Beaver County
Community College of Allegheny County (Allegheny Campus)
Community College of Allegheny County (South Campus)
Community College of Allegheny County (Boyce Campus)
Community College of Allegheny County (North Campus)
Butler County Community College
University of Pittsburgh at Titusville
Pennsylvania Highlands Community College
Potomac State College (WV)
Westmoreland County Community College

PCAA Sports
Men’s Soccer
Men’s Golf
Men’s Baseball (Fall)
Men’s Cross Country
Men’s Basketball
Men’s Volleyball
Men’s Baseball (Spring)
Tennis (Co-ed)
Team Bowling (Co-ed)
Women’s Soccer
Women’s Golf
Women’s Volleyball
Women’s Cross Country
Women’s Basketball
Women’s Softball
Women's Tennis

See also
Garden State Athletic Conference
Pennsylvania State Athletic Conference

References 

NJCAA conferences
College sports in Pennsylvania
Sports organizations established in 1979